The Discovery is the 20th book in the Animorphs series, written by K.A. Applegate. It is narrated by Marco. It is the first book in the David trilogy.

Plot summary

After failing miserably to pick up a girl at his locker, Marco is shocked to find a boy carrying the morphing cube, known as the Escafil Device. Marco introduces himself to the new boy, David, and lamely tries to buy the box off him, but David ignores him. Marco tells Jake about it, and both agree that the situation needs to be taken care of immediately. But that's not the only surprise in store for them. Erek the Chee tells them that a group of six G8 leaders (specifically, those from Britain, France, Russia, Japan, Germany, and the U.S.) are gathering at the Marriott Hotel resort on the city coast to discuss the problems in the Middle East. Erek also tells them that the Yeerks are plotting to infest each leader, and soon the most powerful nations in the world would be under Yeerk influence. The biggest problem is that one of these heads of state is already a Controller. Now the Animorphs need two plans: one to retrieve the blue box, and another to stop the Yeerks from taking over the world.

Marco, Tobias, and Rachel try to raid David's house in bird of prey morphs. Unfortunately, it fails miserably. Tobias is knocked unconscious, Marco is attacked by David's cat, Megadeth, and he and Rachel both get shot at by David with his BB gun. The next day at school, David tells Marco his seemingly ridiculous story about trained robber birds, and discusses his plan to sell the blue box online. In addition, he tells Marco that someone has already responded to his online notice and wants to buy it.  Marco knows that the interested party is Visser Three, and he immediately skips the rest of the schoolday in order to stop the automatic email David has set up (which contains his contact information and his address) from going out. Unfortunately, they're too late, due to David's computer's clock being an hour fast. Marco acquires Spawn, David's contraband, defanged cobra. Visser Three storms into David's house with a team of Hork-Bajir. A fight ensues between the Yeerks and the Animorphs, destroying David's house. Rachel, in bear morph, rams David out the window, and the Animorphs retreat. The Yeerks withdraw with David's mother and father.

The Animorphs are unsure of what to do with David.  Although Ax draws attention to the fact that they can use the box to give him the power to morph, the Animorphs vote on whether or not to actually do it. Marco and Ax, despite the latter having brought up the possibility in the first place, decide that they cannot risk recruiting David, given his strange behavior and their lack of knowledge of him. Tobias votes to take him in out of moral concern and not just leaving him for the Yeerks, while Cassie and Rachel decide that David might be their ticket to recruiting more Animorphs in the future.  Jake is left with the final vote, and he sides with Rachel, Tobias, and Cassie.  With Marco and Ax outvoted, they reveal to David the Yeerk invasion and give him the morphing power.

From the very beginning of his recruitment, David displays his eagerness to kill by attempting to kill Tobias after morphing into a golden eagle (though in this case, he is under the control of the eagle's instincts).  He also does not seem concerned enough about his parents being Controllers. It is only through Marco showing him that his parents are now indeed Controllers that it finally resonates with him. On the way to the Marriott resort, David indiscriminately kills a crow, although he passes it off as his morph's instincts taking control.

As they near the resort, they spot the Blade Ship taking the Marine One helicopter hostage. The Animorphs, fearing that the Yeerks have captured the President of the United States, enter the Visser's ship. The Animorphs are then discovered in cockroach morph, and end up falling out of the Blade Ship, and down into the ocean.

Morphs

Discovery, The
1998 American novels